Fosdevirine is an experimental antiviral agent of the non-nucleoside reverse transcriptase inhibitor class that was studied for potential use in the treatment of HIV-AIDS.

It was discovered by Idenix Pharmaceuticals and was being developed by GlaxoSmithKline and ViiV Healthcare, but it has now been discontinued due to unexpected side effects.

References 

Non-nucleoside reverse transcriptase inhibitors
Indoles
Nitriles
Chloroarenes
Phosphinates
Abandoned drugs